Lars Ellmerich (born 2 January 1961 in Braunschweig) is a retired German footballer. He spent seven seasons in the Bundesliga with Eintracht Braunschweig and FC 08 Homburg, as well as six seasons in the 2. Bundesliga with Braunschweig, Homburg, SSV Ulm 1846, and VfB Oldenburg.

References

External links

1961 births
Living people
Sportspeople from Braunschweig
German footballers
Eintracht Braunschweig players
Eintracht Braunschweig II players
FC 08 Homburg players
SSV Ulm 1846 players
VfB Oldenburg players
Association football midfielders
Bundesliga players
2. Bundesliga players
Footballers from Lower Saxony